Live at Hammersmith '82! is a live album by the band Duran Duran.

The set was the third of three nights at the Hammersmith Odeon. The show was released in various ways, including as a King Biscuit Flower Hour vinyl release and various bootlegs, including "Planet Heart".

The live version of "Make Me Smile (Come Up and See Me)", originally from Steve Harley & Cockney Rebel, was eventually released as the UK b-side to "The Reflex".

The CD/DVD release is supplemented by extra archive DVD content not previously released on DVD, including all six videos made for tracks off the Rio album, as well as two archived Top of the Pops performances.

The release date of Live at Hammersmith '82! coincides with the release of the two-disc (both CD & heavyweight vinyl) special editions of Rio.

For Black Friday Record Store Day 2022, Live at Hammersmith '82!  was reissued on gold double vinyl edition limited to 4500 copies worldwide.

Track listing

2X LP (Reissue, 40th Anniversary Edition) : Parlaphone

Side One

Side Two

Side Three

Side Four

CD/DVD: EMI

References

Duran Duran albums
Live video albums
2009 live albums
2009 video albums
Albums recorded at the Hammersmith Apollo